This page shows the results of the Judo Competition for men and women at the 1983 Pan American Games, held from August 14 to August 29, 1983 in Caracas, Venezuela. There were eight weight divisions, for both men and women. The women's judo competition made its debut at the Pan American Games.

Medal table

Men's competition

Men's Bantamweight (-60 kg)

Men's Featherweight (-65 kg)

Men's Lightweight (-71 kg)

Men's Light Middleweight (-78 kg)

Men's Middleweight (-86 kg)

Men's Light Heavyweight (-95 kg)

Men's Heavyweight (+95 kg)

Men's Open

Women's competition

Women's Extra Lightweight (-48 kg)

Women's Half Lightweight (-52 kg)

Women's Lightweight (-56 kg)

Women's Half Middleweight (-61 kg)

Women's Middleweight (-66 kg)

Women's Half Heavyweight (-72 kg)

Women's Heavyweight (+72 kg)

Women's Open

References
 Sports 123

American Games
1983
Events at the 1983 Pan American Games
Judo competitions in Venezuela
International sports competitions hosted by Venezuela